Belgian-Australian singer Gotye has released three studio albums, one remix album, one live album, one collaborative album, one video album, eleven singles, and at least twenty music videos. Having developed a passion for music in his childhood years, he began his musical career as the lead singer of Australian rock band Downstares. Following the group's dissolution, Gotye turned his interest to creating sample-based electronic music; he sent out demo tapes of his music to several Australian radio stations. In 2002, he formed the indie pop band The Basics with fellow singer-songwriter Kris Schroeder. Gotye later signed to Creative Vibes as a solo artist and released his debut studio album Boardface in February 2003.

Like Drawing Blood, Gotye's second studio album, was released in May 2006. It peaked at number 13 in Australia and was certified platinum by the Australian Recording Industry Association (ARIA). Like Drawing Blood was nominated by radio station Triple J for its annual J Award and produced the singles "Learnalilgivinanlovin" and "Hearts a Mess", which charted in Australia and the Belgian region of Flanders. Mixed Blood, an album containing remixes and cover versions of Gotye's material, was released in June 2007; it peaked at number 64 in Australia.

Gotye released his third studio album Making Mirrors in August 2011; it was preceded by the releases of its first two singles, "Eyes Wide Open" and "Somebody That I Used to Know". The latter became an international hit and topped the charts in thirty-one countries, including Australia, the United Kingdom and the United States. The single also topped American chart provider Billboard'''s 2012 year-end Hot 100 chart. Fueled by the success of "Somebody That I Used to Know", Making Mirrors'' topped the charts in Australia and reached the top ten in several other countries. An additional four singles were released from the album: "I Feel Better", "Easy Way Out", "Save Me" and "State of the Art".

Albums

Studio albums

Collaborative albums

Remix albums

Live albums

Video albums

Singles

Other appearances

Unreleased songs

Music videos

Notes

References

External links
 Official website
 Gotye at AllMusic
 
 

Discography
Alternative rock discographies
Discographies of Australian artists
Discographies of Belgian artists
Pop music discographies